Husain Sirhan (1913/1916? – 1993) was a Saudi Arabian poet. Born in Mecca, he had limited schooling and was largely self-taught. His writing was full of innovative ideas, and he was also exercised by the question of death. He became a recluse in later life. His poetry was translated into English and appeared in two anthologies of Arabian literature.

References

People from Mecca
1993 deaths
20th-century Saudi Arabian people
20th-century Saudi Arabian poets
Year of birth uncertain